Robert Mertens's day gecko (Phelsuma robertmertensi) is  diurnal species of lizard in the family Gekkonidae. The species is endemic to the Comoros.

Etymology
The specific name, robertmertensi, is in honour of German herpetologist Robert Mertens.

Description
The body colour can be dark green or bluish green. An orange mid dorsal stripe extends from the head to the tail. The sides of the neck as well as the flanks are greyish brown.

Geographic range
P. robertmertensi inhabits only a small area on the island of Mayotte in the Comoro Islands.

Habitat
P. robertmertensi is often found on banana trees and in abandoned vanilla orchid plantations.

Diet
P. robertmertensi feeds on various insects and other invertebrates. It also licks soft, sweet fruit, pollen and nectar.

Reproduction
P. robertmertensi is oviparous. The juveniles measure .

Care and maintenance in captivity
P. robertmertensi should be housed in pairs and needs a well planted terrarium. The humidity should be between 75 and 100%. In captivity, it can be fed crickets, wax moth larvae, fruit flies, mealworms and houseflies.

References

Further reading
Henkel F-W, Schmidt W (1995). Amphibien und Reptilien Madagaskars, der Maskarenen, Seychellen und Komoren. Stuttgart: Ulmer. . (in German).
McKeown S (1993). The general care and maintenance of day geckos. Lakeside, California: Advanced Vivarium Systems.
Meier H (1980). "Zur Taxonomie und Ökologie der Gattung Phelsuma (Reptilia: Sauria: Gekkonidae) auf den Komoren, mit Beschreibung einer neuen Art ". Bonner Zoologische Beiträge 31 (3/4): 323-332. (Phelsuma robertmertensi, new species, pp. 327–330, Figure 1). (in German).

Phelsuma
Fauna of Mayotte
Geckos of Africa
Reptiles described in 1980